Hans Walter (9 August 1889 – 14 January 1967) was a Swiss rower who competed in the 1920 Summer Olympics and in the 1924 Summer Olympics.

In 1920 he was part of the Swiss boat, which won the gold medal in the coxed four event. He was also a member of the Swiss eights which was eliminated in the first round of the eight competition. Four years later he won the gold medal as part of the Swiss boat in the coxed fours competition again. He also competed with the Swiss team in the coxless fours event and won the bronze medal.

References

External links
 profile

1889 births
1967 deaths
Swiss male rowers
Olympic rowers of Switzerland
Rowers at the 1920 Summer Olympics
Rowers at the 1924 Summer Olympics
Olympic gold medalists for Switzerland
Olympic bronze medalists for Switzerland
Olympic medalists in rowing
Medalists at the 1924 Summer Olympics
Medalists at the 1920 Summer Olympics
European Rowing Championships medalists
20th-century Swiss people